This is a list of musical compositions for violin, cello and orchestra, ordered by surname of composer

Please see the related entries for concerto, cello and cello concerto for discussion of typical forms and topics.

The orchestra in each case is a standard symphonic orchestra unless otherwise indicated.

A
Kurt Atterberg
Concerto in G minor and C major for violin, cello and string orchestra, Op. 57 (1959–60)

B

Johann Christian Bach
Symphonies concertantes in A major (C.34) and B-flat major (C.46)
 Alexander Bakshi
 Winter in Moscow; Ice-covered ground … for violin, cello and string orchestra (1994)
 Four Elements from Hedmark, Op.85 (2011)
Rainer Bischof
Double Concerto (1980)
Konrad Boehmer
Il combattimento (1989–90)
Johannes Brahms
 Double Concerto in A minor (1887)
Johann Evangelist Brandl
Sinfonia Concertante, Op. 20 (1801)
Cesar Bresgen
Concertino, for violin, cello and small orchestra

C
Cristian Carrara
Machpela, dialog for violin, cello and orchestra (2015)
Bernard Cavanna
Shanghai Concerto (2009)
Friedrich Cerha
Double Concerto (1976)
Gordon Shi-Wen Chin
Double concerto (2006)

D
Richard Danielpour
A Child's Reliquary  (2000)
In the Arms of the Beloved (2001)
Johann Nepomuk David
Concerto for Violin, Cello and Orchestra, Op. 68 (1971) 
Frederick Delius
Double Concerto (1915–16)
Gaetano Donizetti
Double Concerto (Concertino) in D minor (reconstruction by J. Wojciechowski)
 Pascal Dusapin
At Swim-Two-Birds (2017)

E
Thierry Escaich
Miroir d'ombres (2006)

F
Mohammed Fairouz
Double Concerto States of Fantasy (2010)

G
Pierre Gaviniès
Concerto for Violin, Cello and Orchestra (c. 1760 - 1770)
Philip Glass
Double Concerto (2010)
Jorge Grundman
Concerto Sentido for Violin, Viola, Cello and String Orchestra (2007)

H

Daron Hagen
Masquerade (2007)
John Harbison
Double Concerto for Violin and Cello (2009)
Lou Harrison
Double Concerto for Violin, Cello and Gamelan (1982)
Leopold Hofmann
 Concerto in G major for violin, cello and string orchestra
James Horner
Pas de Deux (2014)

J

David Johnstone
 Double Concertante for Violin, Cello and Chamber Orchestra (2009)

K
Leon Kirchner
Concerto for Violin, Cello, 10 Winds and Percussion (1960)
Julius Klengel
Concerto for Violin, Cello and Orchestra, Op. 61 (1924)

L

Ezra Laderman
Concerto (Edition - Schirmer) (1986)
Henri Lazarof
Partita di Madrigal (25 min) (2001)

M
Tigran Mansurian
Double Concerto for violin, cello and string orchestra (1978)
Marko Mihevc
Fidlfadl for Violin, Cello and string orchestra (2003)
Romance for Violin, Cello and string orchestra (2003)
Norbert Moret
Double Concerto (1981)
Wolfgang Amadeus Mozart
Sinfonia Concertante in E flat major, K. 364  (1779) arranged
(original for violin, viola and orchestra)

O
Mark O'Connor
Double Concerto (For the Heroes)

P
Hans Pfitzner
Duo for Violin, Cello and Small Orchestra (or piano)
Ignaz Pleyel
Nocturne (Serenade) in D major, Ben.201a
André Previn
Double Concerto for Violin, Violoncello, and Orchestra (2014)

R
Josef Reicha
Concerto in D major, Op.3
Wolfgang Rihm
Duo Concerto (2015)
Robert Xavier Rodríguez
Favola Concertante, Ballet and Double Concerto for Violin, Cello, and String Orchestra (1975)
Julius Röntgen
Double Concerto (1927)
Ned Rorem
Double Concerto (1998)
Miklós Rózsa
Theme and Variations 
Sinfonia Concertante, Op. 29
Tema con Variazoni, Op. 29a (1958; Op. 29a is a version of the slow movement for smaller orchestra.)

S
Camille Saint-Saëns
 La Muse et le Poète, Op. 132 (1910) - A symphonic poem with violin and cello solo
Alfred Schnittke
Concerto Grosso No. 2 (1981–82)
Percy Sherwood
 Concerto for Violin, Cello and Orchestra (early 1900s) 
Roger Sessions
Double Concerto (1970–71)
David Soldier
Ultraviolet Railroad (1992)
Carl Stamitz
Sinfonia Concertante in D major

T
Josef Tal
Double Concerto for violin, cello & chamber orchestra (1969)
Ivan Tcherepnin
Double Concerto (1996)

V

Henri Vieuxtemps
Duo brilliant, Op. 39
Antonio Vivaldi
Double Concerto ("Il Proteo, o sia Il mondo al rovescio") for Violin, Cello, Strings and continuo in F major, RV 544
Double Concerto ("All'inglese"), for Violin, Cello, Strings & Continuo in A major, RV 546
Double Concerto for violin and cello and strings and continuo in B flat major  RV 547
Antonín Vranický (also spelled Anton Wranitzky)
Two Concertos

W

Robert Ward
Dialogues (1983)

Y

Eugène Ysaÿe
Poème nocturne, Op. 29 (1927)

Z
Ellen Taaffe Zwilich
Concerto for Violin, Violoncello and Orchestra (1991)

Other Double Concertos
Hans Abrahamsen
Concerto for Violin, Piano, and Strings (2011)
Elliott Carter
Concerto for Harpsichord and Piano with Two Chamber Orchestras (1961)
 Edison Denisov
 Concerto for bassoon, cello and orchestra (1982)
Witold Lutosławski
Concerto for Oboe, Harp and Chamber Orchestra (1980)
 Michael Nyman
 Double Concerto for saxophone, cello and orchestra (1996–99)
Antonio Vivaldi
 Concerto for bassoon, cello and orchestra in E minor RV 409

See also
String instrument repertoire
List of solo cello pieces
List of compositions for cello and piano
List of compositions for cello and orchestra
List of triple concertos for violin, cello, and piano

References

 
 
 
Double concertos for violin and cello